The Republic of China (Taiwan) competed at the 1972 Summer Olympics in Munich for the last time as the "Republic of China".  The ROC would not return to the Olympics until 1984 and under the name "Chinese Taipei" due to objections by the People's Republic of China over the political status of Taiwan.

The PRC, amid the height of the Cultural Revolution, boycotted the Olympics due to the ROC participation under the name "Republic of China". 21 competitors, 15 men and 6 women, took part in 41 events in 10 sports.

Archery

In the first modern archery competition at the Olympics, the Republic of China entered only one woman.

Women's:
 Shue Meei-Shya - 2026 points (38th place)

Athletics

Men's 100 metres
Soo Wen-Ho
 First Heat — 10.59s
 Second Heat — 10.82s (→ did not advance)

Men's 200 metres
Soo Wen-Ho
 First Heat — 21.55s
 Second Heat — 21.47s (→ did not advance)

Men's 4 × 100 m relay:
 Lee Chung-Ping, Soo Wen-Ho, Chen Chin-Lung and Chen Ming-Chih
Heat — 41.78 s (→ did not advance)

Men's 110 m hurdles:
 Lee Chung-Ping - Heat: 14.98 s (→ did not advance)

Men's 400 m hurdles:
 Lee Chung-Ping - Heat:52.61 s (→ did not advance)

Men's Long jump
 Chen Chin-Lung - Qualifying round: 6.79 m (→ did not advance)

Men's Triple jump:
 Chen Ming-Chih - Qualifying round: 14.73 m (→ did not advance)

Women's 800 m:
 Lee Chiu-Hsia - Heat: 2:11.8 (→ did not advance)

Women's 1500 m:
 Lee Chiu-Hsia - Heat: 4:37.2 (→ did not advance)

Women's High jump:
 Wu Yu-Chih - Qualifying round: 0 m (→ did not advance)

Women's Long jump:
 Lin Chun-Yu - Qualifying round: 5.50 m (→ did not advance)

Women's Pentathlon:
 Lin Chun-Yu - 3676 points (→ 28th place)

Alternate member
 Chi Cheng

Boxing

Bantamweight:
 Wang Chee-Yen
 1/16-Final - defeated Manoochehr Bahmani of Iran (3 - 2)
 1/8-Final - lost to George Turpin of Great Britain

Cycling

One cyclist represented the Republic of China in 1972.

Individual road race
 Shue Ming-fa — did not finish (→ no ranking)

1000m time trial
 Shue Ming-fa — 1:14.05 (→ 27th place)

Sprint
 Shue Ming-fa
 Preliminary Round — lost to Sergei Kravtsov of Soviet Union and Taworn Tarwan of Thailand
 Preliminary Round, repêchage — Lost to Yoshikazu Cho of Japan and Felix Suarez of Spain

Judo

Lightweight:
 Cheng Chi-Hsiang
 Pool A - lost to Takao Kawaguchi of Japan
 Repêchage Pool - defeated Han Sung-Chul of South Korea
 Repêchage Pool - lost to Bakhaavaa Buidaa of Mongolia

Welterweight:
 Wang Jong-She
 Pool A - defeated William McGregor of Canada
 Pool A - lost to Toyokazu Nomura of Japan
 Repêchage Pool - lost to Antal Hetényi of Hungary

Middleweight:
 Chang Ping-Ho
 Pool A - defeated Raymond Coulibaly of Mali
 Pool A - lost to Jean-Paul Coche of France

Light heavyweight:
 Juang Jen-Wuh
 Pool B - defeated Epigmenio Exiga of Mexico
 Pool B - lost to Chiaki Ishii of Brazil

Open Category:
 Juang Jen-Wuh
 Pool A - lost to Pavle Bajetić of Yugoslavia

Sailing

Finn:
 Chen Shiu-Hsiung - 235.0 (35th place)

Shooting

One male shooter represented Taiwan in 1972.

300 m rifle, three positions
 Wu Tao-yan - 1085 points (30th place)

50 m rifle, three positions
 Wu Tao-yan - 1101 points (51st place)

50 m rifle, prone
 Wu Tao-yan - 591 points (41st place)

Swimming

Women's 100 m freestyle:
 Hsu Yue-Yun - Heat: 1:04.77 (did not advance)

Women's 200 m freestyle:
 Hsu Yue-Yun - Heat: 2:20.17 (did not advance)

Women's 400 m freestyle:
 Hsu Yue-Yun - Heat: 4:58.57 (did not advance)

Women's400 m individual medley:
 Hsu Yue-Yun - did not compete

Women's 100 m breaststroke
 Lie Yue-Hwan - 1:25.47 (did not advance)

Women's 200 m breaststroke
 Lie Yue-Hwan - 3:04.74 (did not advance)

Men's 100 m butterfly:
 Hsu Tung-Hsiung - did not compete

Men's 200 m butterfly:
 Hsu Tung-Hsiung - 2:16,35

Men's 200 m individual medley:
 Hsu Tung-Hsiung - 2:18.34 (did not advance)

Men's 400 m individual medley:
 Hsu Tung-Hsiung - 5:09.56 (did not advance)

Weightlifting

Featherweight:
 Chen Kue-Sen - 327.5 kg (10th place)

Wrestling

Freestyle –57 kg:
 Sheu Jine-Shiong
 Round 1 - lost to Nicolae Dumitru of Romania (4 - 0)
 Round 2 - lost to George Hatziioannidis of Greece (4 - 0)

Notes

References

Nations at the 1972 Summer Olympics
1972
1972 in Taiwanese sport